Cathedral of St. Thomas More may refer to:

United States

Cathedral of Saint Thomas More (Arlington, Virginia)
Co-Cathedral of Saint Thomas More (Tallahassee, Florida)

See also
List of institutions named after Thomas More